M. B. Chetti  is a Vice Chancellor of University of Agricultural Sciences, Dharwad. He was former Assistant Director General, Education Division of Indian Council of Agricultural Research.

References

Indian academic administrators
Living people
1957 births